The Demon Road Trilogy, originally simply Demon Road, is a trilogy series of horror-adventure-road trip novels released in the years 2015 and 2016, consisting of the books Hell and Highway (originally Demon Road), Desolation, and Infernal Finale (originally American Monsters), all by author Derek Landy, with cover illustrations from Alan Clarke. The books follow 16-year-old cursed demon girl Amber Lamont and her amnesiac guide Milo Sebastian, fleeing a family who wishes her dead, as they travel the titular "demon road", on which exists all manner of supernatural beings from whom all horror fiction antagonist creators were subconsciously inspired by to create (primarily the villains of the works of Stephen King and 1980s slasher film villains in the first novel, from which Milo depicted as having been the "real" driver of Christine, and the "real" Scooby-Doo gang in the latter two novels, from which the "real" Daphne Blake, Kelly, is depicted as a lesbian and Amber's love interest).

Originally receiving a nine-book order from HarperCollins, Landy elected to conclude the series after its first trilogy in 2016, deciding to use the remaining six-book order to launch a sequel series to his previous book series, Skulduggery Pleasant, established to be set in the same shared fictional multiverse as Demon Road via Easter eggs throughout the trilogy. The trilogy has received a mixed to positive critical reception.

Setting 
The Demon Road Trilogy revolves around Amber, a seemingly ordinary 16-year-old YA fangirl from Florida who, after a shocking encounter, discovers a dark and twisted family secret: that her parents, their friends, and she herself are demons, out for her blood to fulfil a violent pact with a creature known as the Shining Demon. Forced to run for her life, Amber finds herself under the protection of Milo, a quiet, sarcastic and mysterious man driving a Dodge Charger, which seems to be alive. Tagging along for the ride is Glen, an annoying road trip companion from Hell, who has come to America from Ireland after being told he has forty days to live. Forced to flee across the United States of America via the eponymous Demon Road, from which all horror fiction is derived, the trio find themselves facing demonic and otherworldly dangers as they search for a way to stop Amber's parents; undead serial killers, vampires, servants of hell and, of course, the ebony-horned and red-skinned demons that are relentlessly hunting the trio.

In Desolation, the Devil is depicted as a monk in the likeness of Neil Patrick Harris, who allows for Amber to escape Hell.

In American Monsters, a selection of men in black founded by Amber's brother are revealed to be engaged in civil war.

Development 

In October 2015, ahead of the German language release of Demon Road, Carsten Biernat of Unique Voodoo Studios revealed that the institution had been commissioned to create the cover of the German version of the novel, sharing concept sculptures of Amber in her demon form they had created on being asked to "bring the character to life". In April 2016, Derek Landy and Unique Voodoo expresed interest in the concept models being produced as Demon Road collectable merchandise.

Promoting Desolation, elaborating on the series' premise of travelling the titular "Demon Road" from which all "the shining stars of horror fiction, both on the page and on the screen" is derived, as "the perfect opportunity to tip my hat to Stephen King[,] Wes Craven[,] and a host of other creators", Landy described the trilogy as "a love letter to American horror, books, TV, comics, movies [where] every few chapters there’s a new character with a new story and each one of these encounters is a different trope of American horror. It’s Stephen King books, it’s Wes Craven movies… [for example] the Dacre Shanks character is influenced by Freddie Krueger[…] It meant it could be a litany of horror tropes[…] Over the course of the three books, there’ll be a Nightmare On Elm Street, there’ll be X-Files, there’ll be Buffy, there’ll be [more] Stephen King, Psycho… everything I loved as a horror fan is all in this series."

Novels

() 

For anyone who ever thought their parents were monsters… Amber Lamont is a normal sixteen-year-old. Smart but insecure, she spends most of her time online, where she can avoid her beautiful, aloof parents and their weird friends. But when a shocking encounter reveals a horrifying secret, Amber is forced to go on the run. Killer cars, vampires, undead serial killers and red-skinned, horned demons – Amber hurtles from one threat to the next, revealing the terror woven into the very fabric of her life. As her parents close in behind her, Amber’s only chance rests with her fellow travellers, who are not at all what they appear to be…

Desolation 

In the second novel, reeling from their bloody encounter in New York City, Amber and Milo flee north. On their trail are the Hounds of Hell – five demonic bikers who will stop at nothing to drag their quarries back to their unholy master. Amber and Milo’s only hope lies within Desolation Hill – a small town with a big secret; a town with a darkness to it, where evil seeps through the very floorboards. Until, on one night every year, it spills over onto the streets and all hell breaks loose. And that night is coming…

() 

In the final novel, bigger, meaner, stronger, Amber closes in on her murderous parents as they make one last desperate play for power. Her own last hopes of salvation, however, rest beyond vengeance, beyond the abominable killers – living and dead – that she and Milo will have to face. For Amber’s future lies in her family’s past, in the brother and sister she never knew, and the horrors beyond imagining that befell them.

Reception 
Louisa Mellor of Den of Geek praised the trilogy as "like binge-watching an exciting Netflix series", expressing interest in a potential future television adaptation of the series. Track of Words described Demon Road as "a classic young adult chase novel[...] great fun [which] demonstrates Landy’s skill with world building and storytelling".

Angel Reads praised the "writing style [a]s easy to read and simple[...] nothing hard about it and even teens on the younger side will be able to read Demon Road. I loved the wit[…] the dialogue was sharp and hit you right in the chest, and it was different and fun", referring to "the characterisation of Landy characters [as] fun, different and bright", before concluding that "Demon Road was a fun, sassy and gruesome read [t]hat showed that sometimes the outside of people can be deceiving [and] that sometimes people can be good and evil all at the same time." Heart Full of Books meanwhile called Demon Road "the perfect mix of Percy Jackson and the TV show Supernatural[…] pacy and a little gory, [concluding] if you’re up for that, then I would definitely give it a go." Paper Fury similarly compared Demon Road to Supernatural, lauding its "snortingly good humour" and "fast moving wickedly captivating action scenes."

See also 
 Skulduggery Pleasant (2007–2014) and Valkyrie Cain (2017–2022), Derek Landy's previous and following book series.
 Scooby-Doo, from which the members of Mystery Incorporated are adapted in Desolation and American Monsters.
 It (character) and It Follows, from which the titular "It" creations are depicted as one composite character in Desolation.

References 

Book series introduced in 2015
Demon novels
Fantasy novel trilogies
2010s horror novels
Irish LGBT novels
2015 Irish novels
2016 Irish novels
Novels set in Florida
Novels with lesbian themes
Parodies of Scooby-Doo
LGBT-related horror literature
Lovecraftian horror
HarperCollins books